Nicholas Wilton is an English actor and scriptwriter. He has appeared as Mr Lister in the BBC soap opera EastEnders as a recurring character; he has also appeared in Carrott's Lib and Jackanory.

Early life
Wilton studied English and Drama at the University of Kent. His first professional engagement was in 1979 as a bluecoat entertainer at a Pontins holiday camp. He then spent two years as a stage manager in theatres, before moving into acting.

Career

Acting
Wilton made his acting debut in 1980 in the Whitehall farce Simple Spymen, directed by Brian Rix, and went on to play opposite Rix in the West End revival of Dry Rot at the Lyric Theatre, Shaftesbury Avenue in 1988. He has appeared in many television shows, such as the BBC soap opera EastEnders, Doctors (twice), Casualty, Heartbeat, The Bill (three times), Carrott's Lib (two series and Election Specials), The Omid Djalili Show and the children's show Scoop. He appeared as a guest in My Dad's the Prime Minister, No. 73 (five series), Saturday Superstore as Mo the Crow and as Mr Seagrove for 11 episodes in Big Meg, Little Meg. He was also a writer and performer for the children's sketch show Fast Forward for 19 episodes between 1984 and 1987.

He has appeared in many stage productions, such as Michael Cooney's play Cash on Delivery at the Whitehall Theatre (now Trafalgar Studios), directed by Ray Cooney, and Tom, Dick and Harry, as well as The Railway Children, playing Mr Perks in four UK tours. On radio, he appeared in and wrote for In One Ear (3 series), Son of Cliché (2 series), Cover to Cover, Aspects of the Fringe and The Story So Far. He has written dialogue and provided voices for exhibitions at the London Transport Museum; presented the comedy channel for Emirates and SriLankan Airlines from 1998 to 2010, and made a recording of Ricky Gervais's biography, The Story So Far. In the late eighties, he also performed cabaret.

Since 2000 he has appeared as Pantomime dame every Christmas. In 2011, he appeared in a Specsavers advert alongside chef Gordon Ramsay. The following year, he was cast in the film version of Ray Cooney's farce Run for Your Wife. Wilton has also starred in international stage productions such as No Sex Please - We're British, produced by the British Theatre Playhouse in Singapore and Kuala Lumpur in May 2015, and A Bedfull of Foreigners, produced by the same company in Singapore and Kuala Lumpur in September 2006.

Scriptwriting
Wilton is also a scriptwriter and has written for Three of a Kind, Play Away, In One Ear (three series), The Smith and Jones Sketchbook, Smack the Pony, WYSIWYG and wrote one episode of Jackanory. In 1987 he wrote an episode for The Les Dennis Laughter Show and in 1984 he wrote four episodes of Spitting Image. Wilton also wrote for Not the Nine O'Clock News, A Kick Up the Eighties and the TV series Alas Smith and Jones.

Pantomime
He first performed  in pantomime in 1987 and as a dame every Christmas since 2000.

Awards and nominations
Wilton was nominated for the Perrier Award alongside his revue group, Writers Inc and won in 1982. He was in the "Carrott's Lib" team that won the BAFTA for Best Light Entertainment programme in 1983. On radio he was in the two Sony Award-winning comedy series Son of Cliché (best comedy 1984), with Chris Barrie and Nick Maloney, which was written by Red Dwarf creators Rob Grant and Doug Naylor, and In One Ear (best comedy 1985) with Clive Mantle, Helen Lederer and Steve Brown, produced by Jamie Rix.

Personal life
Wilton was formerly married to Julie Dawn Cole, with whom he has two children. He later married actress Lynette McMorrough.

Filmography
Films

Television

Radio

Writer

Online

References

External links
 
 
 
 
 

Living people
English male stage actors
English male soap opera actors
English male voice actors
Pantomime dames
20th-century English male actors
21st-century English male actors
People from North Norfolk (district)
Alumni of the University of Kent
Male actors from Kent
Year of birth missing (living people)